The 2000 season was the Hawthorn Football Club's 76th season in the Australian Football League and 99th overall.

Fixture

Premiership season

Finals series

Ladder

References

Hawthorn Football Club seasons